Norman Cyril Jackson VC (8 April 1919 – 26 March 1994) was a sergeant in the Royal Air Force (RAF) who earned the Victoria Cross during a Second World War bombing raid on Schweinfurt, Germany in April 1944.

Early life
Born in Ealing, Middlesex, Jackson was adopted as a one-week-old baby by Mr. and Mrs. Edwin Gunter. The Gunters also adopted Geoffrey Oliver Hartley, who in 1951 was awarded the George Medal as a Federation of Malaya police lieutenant for protecting his party, which included three children, from bandits. Upon this occasion, Mrs. Gunter said, "We adopted two of the finest sons any parents could wish for."

Jackson qualified as a fitter and turner. Although he was married and in a reserved occupation at the outbreak of the Second World War, he enlisted in the RAF.

Military career
He joined the RAF Volunteer Reserve in 1939 and originally served as a Classified Fitter IIE (engines). In January 1941, he was assigned to a Sunderland flying boat squadron based in Freetown, Sierra Leone. He applied for retraining as a flight engineer and returned to England in September 1942.

On 28 July 1943, he joined No. 106 Squadron which operated Avro Lancaster bombers. Jackson completed his tour of 30 missions on 24 April 1944, but, as he had flown one sortie with a different crew, he chose to fly once more so that he and his original aircrew could finish their tour together. Jackson's 31st mission was a raid on the German ball bearing factories at Schweinfurt on the night of 26–27 April.

Having bombed the target, Jackson's Lancaster (serial ME669) was attacked by a German night fighter and a fuel tank in the starboard wing caught fire. He gripped the air intake on the leading edge of the wing with one hand, and fought the fire with the other. The flames seared his hands, face, and clothes. The fighter returned and hit the bomber with a burst of gunfire that sent two bullets into his legs. The burst also swept him off the wing.

He fell , but his smouldering and holed parachute worked well enough to save his life. He suffered further injuries upon landing, including a broken ankle, but managed to crawl to a nearby German village the next morning, where he was paraded through the street.

He spent 10 months recovering in hospital before being transferred to the Stalag IX-C prisoner-of-war camp. He made two escape attempts, the second of which was successful as he made contact with a unit of the US Third Army.

Jackson's exploit became known when the surviving crewmen of his bomber were released from German captivity at the end of the war. He was promoted to warrant officer and his Victoria Cross (VC) award was gazetted on 26 October 1945. When he went to Buckingham Palace to receive his VC from King George VI, he was accompanied by Leonard Cheshire who was also due to receive his on that day. Group Captain Cheshire insisted that, despite the difference in rank, they should approach the King together. Jackson remembers that Cheshire said to the King, "This chap stuck his neck out more than I did – he should get his VC first! Of course the King had to keep to protocol but I will never forget what Cheshire said."

Victoria Cross citation
Extract from Fourth Supplement, The London Gazette No 37324 of Friday 26 October 1945:

Postwar and personal life
After the war, he worked as a travelling salesman of Haig whisky.

He and his wife Alma had seven children. Jackson died on 26 March 1994 at Hampton Hill, in the London Borough of Richmond upon Thames, and is buried in Twickenham Cemetery.

Legacy

In April 2004, Jackson's VC medal was sold at auction to Lord Ashcroft for £235,250 (GBP) against a pre-auction estimate of £130,000. His family were upset because the medal went to a private bidder rather than the RAF museum at Hendon. They had planned to give their father's medals to the museum, but found they could not do so under the terms of their mother's will and the museum was outbid. His VC is now on display in the Lord Ashcroft Gallery at the Imperial War Museum, London.

Norman Jackson's son appeared in the episode on his father's crew in Lord Ashcroft's documentary series Heroes of the Skies (broadcast on Channel Five on 4 October 2012), as well as the Discovery Channel's Air Aces (premiering October 2013).

See also
 James Allen Ward, a bomber pilot who was awarded the Victoria Cross for climbing out of his flying bomber to put out a wing fire

Notes

References

Sources
British VCs of World War 2 (John Laffin, 1997)
Monuments To Courage (David Harvey, 1999)
The Register of the Victoria Cross (This England, 1997)
Bravest of the Brave (John Glanfield, 2005)

External links
Burial location of Norman Jackson "Middlesex"
News item "Norman Jackson's Victoria Cross sold at auction"
Norman Jackson

British World War II recipients of the Victoria Cross
Royal Air Force recipients of the Victoria Cross
Royal Air Force airmen
People from Ealing
Royal Air Force Volunteer Reserve personnel of World War II
1919 births
1994 deaths
British World War II prisoners of war
World War II prisoners of war held by Germany
Escapees from German detention
Military personnel from London
English escapees